Zlatan Ljubijankić (born 15 December 1983) is a Slovenian former professional footballer who played as a forward.

International career
Ljubijankić was a member of Slovenia national team between 2006 and 2015. He scored one of three Slovenia's goals at the 2010 FIFA World Cup, against the United States in a 2–2 draw.

Career statistics

Club

International 
Scores and results list Slovenia's goal tally first, score column indicates score after each Ljubijankić goal.

Honours
Domžale
Slovenian First League: 2006–07
Slovenian Supercup: 2007

Gent
Belgian Cup: 2010

Urawa Red Diamonds
J1 League First Stage: 2015
J.League Cup: 2016
Suruga Bank Championship: 2017
AFC Champions League: 2017
Emperor's Cup: 2018

Individual
J. League Division 1 Player of the Month: 2013 (April)

See also
Slovenian international players

References

External links

 
 Player profile at NZS 
 
 
 

1983 births
Living people
Slovenian people of Bosnia and Herzegovina descent
Footballers from Ljubljana
Slovenian footballers
Association football forwards
Slovenia international footballers
Slovenia under-21 international footballers
Slovenia youth international footballers
2010 FIFA World Cup players
Slovenian PrvaLiga players
Slovenian Second League players
Belgian Pro League players
J1 League players
NK Domžale players
K.A.A. Gent players
Omiya Ardija players
Urawa Red Diamonds players
Slovenian football managers
Slovenian expatriate footballers
Slovenian expatriate sportspeople in Belgium
Expatriate footballers in Belgium
Slovenian expatriate sportspeople in Japan
Expatriate footballers in Japan